The Savannahlander is an Australian passenger train service (primarily serving tourists) that operates in Far North Queensland. It  travels on the Tablelands railway line and the  Etheridge railway line from the coastal city of Cairns to Forsayth.

History

The service was introduced on 3 April 1995 by Queensland Rail to replace the Forsayth Mixed (marketed as the 'Last Great Train Ride'). The line was closed from Mareeba to Mount Surprise at the same time. It was initially run with a 2000 class railmotor set that was refurbished at Townsville Workshops. This was only on the Mount Surprise to Forsayth section of the Etheridge line. However, after an upgrade of the line for sugar syrup trains from Cairns to Arriga, and a limited restoration of the rest of the line, the railmotor started travelling from Cairns to Forsayth in September 1998.  In 2004 it was decided to run it under contract by a private operator, Cairns Kuranda Steam Pty Ltd. While primarily a passenger service between Cairns and Forsayth, the train can be chartered for large groups.

On 27 March 2019, a car collided with the Savannahlander at a level crossing in the city of Cairns. The driver of the car failed to give way at the crossing and was subsequently injured in the crash.

Route and timetable

Running for 39 weeks in the year, The Savannahlander departs Cairns railway station at 06:30 Wednesday mornings  and travels up the scenic Kuranda Range past the Barron Falls  to Kuranda. It then travels to the south-west on the Chillagoe-Mungana branch line. The train travels through the towns of Mareeba  and Dimbulah before passing through Lappa Junction and arriving in Almaden where it stays for the night. On Thursday morning The Savannahlander continues south-west on the Etheridge Railway. The rail motor passes through Mount Surprise and Einasleigh before terminating at Forsayth railway station. On Friday the train departs Forsayth for Mount Surprise. The train then departs for Cairns on Saturday morning.

Rolling stock 
The Savannahlander rollingstock comprises three former two-car Queensland Railways 2000 class rail motors.

Two (2026 and 2028) are "PD" (Passenger / Driving) cars. These units have the classic 1960s era streamlined front ends and were built for Queensland Rail in 1963. Originally they had 160 HP Rolls-Royce diesel engines fitted.

The third (2053) is a 2051 class rail motor, known as a "PLDT" (Passenger & Luggage / Driving / Trailing) car. These cars have access doors at each end at the expense of the streamlined front. This allows the cars to be placed in the middle of the other sets and sets of three or four cars can be formed. There were only four of this style of car built, and they were originally fitted with an AEC engine. It was built in 1971 and re-powered along with the other Savannahlander units in 2005.

All were repowered in 2005 with a 250 HP Cummins diesel and Allison gear box combination.

See also 

 List of named passenger trains of Australia

References

External links

Named passenger trains of Queensland
Far North Queensland
Railway services introduced in 1995
1995 establishments in Australia
Tourist railways in Queensland